The 1998 Bournemouth International was a men's tennis tournament played on Clay in Bournemouth, Great Britain that was part of the International Series of the 1998 ATP Tour. It was the third edition of the tournament and was held from 14 to 20 September 1998.

Seeds
Champion seeds are indicated in bold text while text in italics indicates the round in which those seeds were eliminated.

Draw

Finals

Top half

Bottom half

References

Singles
Brighton International